Makola South Ihala Grama Niladhari Division is a Grama Niladhari Division of the Biyagama Divisional Secretariat of Gampaha District of Western Province, Sri Lanka. It has Grama Niladhari Division Code 271.

Mawaramandiya are located within, nearby or associated with Makola South Ihala.

Makola South Ihala is a surrounded by the Heiyanthuduwa North, Sapugaskanda, Makola North Central, Makola North Ihala and Mawaramandiya Grama Niladhari Divisions.

Demographics

Ethnicity 
The Makola South Ihala Grama Niladhari Division has a Sinhalese majority (98.2%). In comparison, the Biyagama Divisional Secretariat (which contains the Makola South Ihala Grama Niladhari Division) has a Sinhalese majority (91.7%)

Religion 
The Makola South Ihala Grama Niladhari Division has a Buddhist majority (93.8%). In comparison, the Biyagama Divisional Secretariat (which contains the Makola South Ihala Grama Niladhari Division) has a Buddhist majority (86.5%)

References 

Grama Niladhari Divisions of Biyagama Divisional Secretariat